A Strange Course of Events is a 2013 French-Israeli drama film directed by Raphaël Nadjari. It was screened in the Directors' Fortnight section at the 2013 Cannes Film Festival.

Plot
Saul is a matured man who is prone to avoid confrontations. One day he decides to visit his father who seems to suffer with a variety of issues and who usually blames the son for all his misfortune. Their first encounter after five years is rather alienating for Saul who discovers that his father is into yoga.

Cast
 Ori Pfeffer as Saul
 Moni Moshonov as Simon
 Michaela Eshet as Bathy
 Maya Kenig as Orly
 Bethany Gorenberg as Michal
 Maya Dagan as Ronit

References

External links
 

2013 films
2013 drama films
French drama films
2010s Hebrew-language films
Films directed by Raphael Nadjari
Israeli drama films
2010s French films